The 2013 Machang Coal Mine outburst occurred in Machang Coal Mine in Shuicheng County, Guizhou, China. A total of 25 people lost their lives in the accident.

Location
Machang Coal Mine is located in Shuicheng, Liupanshui, Guizhou. The mine belongs to Gemudi Company of Guizhou Water & Mining Group. The coal and gas outburst occurred on March 12, 2013 at about 20:00 local time. At the time of the outburst, there were 83 workers working underground, and 58 of them managed to leave safely. Most of the 25 people who died in the accident were locals from Guizhou.

References 

Machang Coal Mine outburst
Mining disasters in China
Machang Coal Mine outburst
History of Guizhou